The B4265 road (often known as the Barry-Llantwit road) is a main road in the Vale of Glamorgan, southeastern Wales, running in a northwesterly direction along near the coast. It links Cardiff Airport to Bridgend, lasting for 15.9 miles (25.6 km). Passing the junction turnoff to Gileston and St Athan, at Llantwit Major, the B4270 road branches off to the northwest to Llandow Industrial Estate. The road then moves progressively in northwesterly direction until St Brides Major, where the B4524 road to the south connects it to Southerndown and Ogmore-by-Sea.

10 February 2014, road work began to straighten the road to allow better access to St Athan and Cardiff Airport Enterprise Zone.

References

External links

 SABRE page

Roads in the Vale of Glamorgan